is a 3 km long and 50 hectares narrow sandbank in Kita-ku, Osaka city, Japan, that divides the Kyū-Yodo into the Tosabori and Dōjima rivers. Many governmental and commercial offices (including the city hall of Osaka), museums and other cultural facilities are located on Nakanoshima.

Landmarks and architecture

(from east to west)
Nakanoshima Park
Rose garden
Central Public Hall
Nakanoshima Library
City Hall
Bank of Japan Osaka branch
Nakanoshima Festival Tower (Headquarters of the Asahi Shimbun)
Nakanoshima Mitsui Building
Headquarters of Kansai Electric Power Company
Osaka University Nakanoshima Center
Rihga Royal Hotel
Nakanoshima Centre Building

Cultural facilities
(from east to west)
Museum of Oriental Ceramics, Osaka
Festival Hall (Nakanoshima Festival Tower East)
National Museum of Art, Osaka
Science Museum
Osaka International Convention Center

Transportation

Train
Keihan Electric Railway
Keihan Main Line: Yodoyabashi Station, Kitahama Station
Nakanoshima Line: Naniwabashi Station, Ōebashi Station, Watanabebashi Station, Nakanoshima Station
Osaka Municipal Subway
Midosuji Line: Yodoyabashi Station
Yotsubashi Line: Higobashi Station
Hanshin Electric Railway Main Line: Fukushima Station
JR Tōzai Line: Shin-Fukushima Station

Pedestrian road
Nakanoshima Promenade

See also

Hotarumachi

 
Kita-ku, Osaka
Geography of Osaka